The 31st Boat Race took place on the 28 March 1874. The Boat Race is an annual side-by-side rowing race between crews from the Universities of Oxford and Cambridge along the River Thames.  In a race umpired by former Oxford rower Joseph William Chitty, Cambridge won by three and a half lengths in their fifth consecutive victory.

Background

The Boat Race is a side-by-side rowing competition between the University of Oxford (sometimes referred to as the "Dark Blues") and the University of Cambridge (sometimes referred to as the "Light Blues").  The race was first held in 1829, and since 1845 has taken place on the  Championship Course on the River Thames in southwest London.  Cambridge went into the race as reigning champions, having defeated Oxford by three lengths in the previous year's race, while Oxford led overall with sixteen wins to Cambridge's fourteen.

Cambridge were coached by John Graham Chambers (who rowed for Cambridge in the 1862 and 1863 races, and was non-rowing boat club president for the 1865 race), William Henry Lowe (who rowed for Cambridge in the 1868, 1870 and 1871 races) and John Goldie (the Cambridge boat club president and rower for the 1869, 1870 and 1871 races).  Oxford's coach was S. D. Darbishire (who rowed for the Dark Blues in 1868, 1869 and 1870).

Cambridge opted not to use the boat built for them by Harry Clasper specifically for the race, in favour of one constructed by Waites which had been used by 1st Trinity Boat Club. The race was umpired by Joseph William Chitty who had rowed for Oxford twice in 1849 (in the March and December races) and the 1852 race, while the starter was Edward Searle.

Crews
The Cambridge crew weighed an average of 11 st 10.625 lb (74.5 kg),  more than their opponents.  Oxford saw the return of two former Blues in William Edward Sherwood and A. W. Nicholson (who was rowing in his third Boat Race).  Cambridge's crew included five Blues, with James Brooks Close and Charles Stokes Read returning for a third time.  

The Light Blue crew included Australian George Francis Armytage, the only non-British participant in the race, who had been educated at Geelong Grammar School.  Author and former Oxford rower G. C. Drinkwater described the Oxford crew as "something of a disappointment" while declaring that Cambridge were "a very fine crew".

Race

Cambridge won the toss and elected to start from the Middlesex side of the river, handing the Surrey station to Oxford.   The race started at 11.14 a.m. and was "rowed on an exceptionally sluggish tide". Cambridge made a good start and held a half-length lead at Hammersmith Bridge.  As the bend of the river began to give advantage to the Surrey side, Oxford drew back into contention and the crews were level at the bottom of Chiswick Reach.  The position of moored barges provided a good course and smooth water for the Dark Blues who took a half-length lead.

Despite this, fatigue began to set in to the Oxford crew and Cambridge came back into contention.  With a steady rhythm, the Light Blues were level at the Bathing Place of Athens and held a clear water advantage by The Bull's Head pub.  A length ahead by Barnes Bridge, Cambridge pulled further ahead to win by  lengths in a time of 22 minutes 35 seconds.  It was Cambridge's fifth consecutive victory and took the overall record to 16–15 in favour of Oxford.

References
Notes

Bibliography

External links
 Official website

1874 in English sport
The Boat Race
March 1874 sports events